The 1984–85 Segunda División B season was the 8th since its establishment. The first matches of the season were played on 1 September 1984, and the season ended on 17 May 1985.

Overview before the season
40 teams joined the league, including four relegated from the 1983–84 Segunda División and 6 promoted from the 1983–84 Tercera División. The composition of the groups was determined by the Royal Spanish Football Federation, attending to geographical criteria.

Relegated from Segunda División
Linares
Algeciras
Palencia
Rayo Vallecano

Promoted from Tercera División'''

Pontevedra
Orihuela
Marbella
Manacor
Levante
Barcelona Aficionados

Group I

Teams
Teams from Andorra, Aragon, Asturias, Basque Country, Castile and León, Catalonia, Galicia and Navarre.

League table

Results

Top goalscorers

Top goalkeepers

Group II
Teams from Andalusia, Balearic Islands, Castilla–La Mancha, Catalonia, Ceuta, Extremadura, Madrid and Valencian Community.

Teams

League table

Results

Top goalscorers

Top goalkeepers

Segunda División B seasons
3
Spain